"Blow Away" is a song by English musician George Harrison that was released in February 1979 on his album George Harrison. It was also the lead single from the album. The song is one of Harrison's most popular recordings from his solo career and has appeared on the compilations Best of Dark Horse 1976–1989 and Let It Roll: Songs by George Harrison.

Writing and recording
The song is one of Harrison's simplest compositions. Its uptempo pop sound fell far outside the dominant genres of the era: disco and punk. The end of "Blow Away", written on a rainy day (that's why first verses are about clouds), was included in Nuns on the Run – a comedy with Eric Idle and Robbie Coltrane.

In his autobiography, I, Me, Mine, Harrison says that the song arose from feelings of frustration and inadequacy resulting from a leaking roof at his Friar Park home. While viewing the downpour from an outbuilding on the property, he realised that, in surrendering to the problem, he was merely exacerbating it. With this realisation, the episode served as a reminder that he, in fact, "loved everybody" and should seek to be more optimistic. Additionally, he notes that, while he initially felt self-conscious about the song, thinking it "so obvious", the track grew on him when he recorded it.

Music video
The video for "Blow Away" includes shots of Harrison miming to the song superimposed over footage of moving clouds and land, and in some instances, accompanied by large toys (a wind-up duck; sitting in a toy swan and on a dog). There are also instances of Harrison acting silly – breaking into a quick smirk as the camera closes in on the lyric "be happy", and doing a playful dance step.  This video was not included on the Dark Horse Years box set DVD.

Reception
Billboards singles reviewer said "Blow Away" had a "catchy melody" and that Harrison was in "top form both vocally and lyrically". Cash Box listed the single first in its "feature picks" for the week, saying that it might "augur a new beginning" for the artist, with its buoyant mood, "strumming acoustic guitars, wood block beat, synthesizer moods and appealing singing".  Record World said it has Harrison's "familiar guitar sound and a pop/rock beat that should appeal to several formats."  Nick DeRiso of Ultimate Classic Rock calls it "a soul-lifting track about clearing skies and opening hearts that's aged as well as any '70s-era solo Beatles single".

"Blow Away" reached number 51 on the UK Singles Chart, his first chart appearance on that chart since "You" in 1975. The single peaked at number 16 and number 7, respectively, in the United States and Canada. On the US Easy Listening chart, it reached number 2.

"Blow Away" became one of Harrison's more popular songs among his fans. In 2010, AOL radio listeners chose the track as one of the "10 Best George Harrison Songs", appearing at number 2 on the list, behind "My Sweet Lord". "Blow Away" appears on the Harrison compilations Best of Dark Horse 1976–1989 (1989) and Let It Roll: Songs by George Harrison (2009). His demo of the song was released as an iTunes-exclusive bonus track on George Harrison.

Personnel
According to author Simon Leng:

George Harrison – vocals, 12-string acoustic guitars, slide guitar, electric guitar, backing vocals
 Neil Larsen – electric piano
 Andy Newmark – drums
 Willie Weeks – bass
 Ray Cooper – percussion
 Del Newman – string arrangement

Chart performance

Weekly charts

Year-end charts

References

Sources

External links
 

1979 songs
1979 singles
George Harrison songs
Dark Horse Records singles
Songs written by George Harrison
Song recordings produced by George Harrison
Song recordings produced by Russ Titelman
Music published by Oops Publishing and Ganga Publishing, B.V.